Ustikolina is a village and the seat of the municipality of Foča-Ustikolina, Federation of Bosnia and Herzegovina, Bosnia and Herzegovina.

A proposal to dam the Drina River at Ustikolina for a hydroelectric power station was rejected by the municipal authorities in October 2006.

Demographics 
According to the 2013 census, its population was 882.

References

Populated places in Foča-Ustikolina